Fever is a studio album by American musician Roy Ayers. It was released in 1979 through Polydor Records. Recording sessions for the album took place at Sigma Sound Studios and Electric Lady Studios in New York City, and at Record Plant in Los Angeles. Production was handled by Ayers himself with co-production by Carla Vaughn.

The album peaked at number 67 on the Billboard 200 albums chart and at number 25 on the Top R&B/Hip-Hop Albums chart in the United States. Its lead single, "Love Will Bring Us Back Together", reached peak position #41 on the Hot R&B/Hip-Hop Songs chart.

Track listing

Personnel 

 Roy Ayers – lead vocals (tracks: 1-7), backing vocals (track 2), electric piano (tracks: 1, 5, 6, 8), clavinet (tracks: 1, 5, 6), handclaps (track 1), cowbell (track 2), ARP String Synthesizer (track 4), vibraphone (tracks: 6-8), ARP Omni (track 8), producer
 Carla Vaughn – lead vocals (tracks: 2, 3, 6), backing vocals (tracks: 1, 5), co-producer
 Wayne Garfield – lead vocals (track 4)
 Kathleen Jackson – lead vocals (track 4)
 Ethel Beatty – backing vocals (track 2)
 Jim Gilstrap – backing vocals (track 5)
 Philip Woo – ARP String Synthesizer & Oberheim piano (track 2)
 Harold Land, Jr. – electric piano (tracks: 4, 7), piano (track 7)
 Chuck Anthony – guitar (tracks: 1, 4, 5, 8)
 George Baker – guitar (tracks: 2, 3)
 Gregory David Moore – guitar (track 7)
 William Henry Allen – bass (tracks: 1, 3, 6), handclaps (track 1)
 Kerry Turman – bass (tracks: 2, 4, 5, 7)
 Neil Jason – bass (track 8)
 Bernard Lee "Pretty" Purdie – drums (tracks: 1-4, 8)
 Gene Dunlap – drums (tracks: 5, 7)
 Howard Terrance King – drums (track 6)
 Chano O'Ferral – percussion (track 2), congas (tracks: 5, 7)
 James Richard "Dick" Griffin – trombone (track 2)
 Justo Almario – tenor saxophone (tracks: 3, 4, 7, 8)
 John Clifford Mosley, Jr. – trumpet (track 4)
 Sinclair Acey – trumpet (track 7)
Technical
 Jerry Solomon – engineering
 Ron Johnsen – engineering
 Andy Abrams – engineering
 Deni King – engineering
 Carla Bandini – assistant engineering
 Greg Calbi – mastering

Chart history

References

External links 

1979 albums
Roy Ayers albums
Polydor Records albums
Albums produced by Roy Ayers
Albums recorded at Electric Lady Studios
Albums recorded at Sigma Sound Studios